Bednarzówka may refer to the following villages in Poland:
 Bednarzówka, Lublin Voivodeship (east Poland)
 Bednarzówka, Warmian-Masurian Voivodeship (north-east Poland)